Maria Basaglia (1912 – 5 May 1998) was an Italian director and screenwriter.

Life and career 
Born in Cremona, Basaglia started her career as dubbing director for the production company Scalera Film. Between 1939 and 1944 she wrote several films, mainly collaborating with her husband Marcello Albani; during the war she moved to Venice, where she collaborated on several film productions of the short-lived Republic of Salo. After the war, Basaglia directed two films, the comedy Sua altezza ha detto no and the melodrama Sangue di zingara. In 1957 she moved with her husband to Brazil, where they founded the production company Paulistánia Film.

Filmography 

 Angelica, directed by Jean Choux (1939), screenwriter 
 , directed by Jeff Musso (1939), screenwriter 
 , directed by Marcello Albani (1939), screenwriter 
 Boccaccio, directed by Marcello Albani (1940), screenwriter 
 , directed by Marcello Albani (1941), screenwriter 
 , directed by Marcello Albani (1942), screenwriter 
 , directed by Marcello Albani (1942), screenwriter 
 , directed by Marcello Albani (1946), screenwriter 
 , (1953), screenwriter and director
 Sangue di zingara, (1956), director

References

External links 
 

1912 births
1998 deaths
Mass media people from Cremona
20th-century Italian writers
Italian film directors
Italian women film directors
Italian women screenwriters
20th-century Italian women writers
20th-century screenwriters